Jonathan H. Adler is an American legal commentator and law professor at the Case Western Reserve University School of Law. He has been recognized as one of the most cited professors in the field of environmental law. His research is also credited with inspiring litigation that challenged the Obama Administration's implementation of the Affordable Care Act, resulting in the Supreme Court's decision in King v. Burwell.

Early life and education 

Adler was born in Philadelphia, Pennsylvania. He graduated from Friends' Central School before attending Yale University, where he majored in History, graduating magna cum laude in May 1991 with distinction in History. After working several years at the Competitive Enterprise Institute, Adler attended law school at the George Mason University School of Law. He attended at night while continuing to work at CEI. He was the Articles Editor for the George Mason Law Review from 1998–1999. He graduated summa cum laude in May 2000 as the class valedictorian.

Career 
Adler is currently a tenured professor at Case Western Reserve University (CWRU)'s School of Law where he teaches courses in environmental, regulatory, and constitutional law. He is the Director of the law school's Coleman P. Burke Center for Environmental Regulation. In 2011, Adler was named the inaugural holder of the Johan Verheij Memorial Professorship at CWRU.

Adler is a contributing editor to the conservative National Review Online and a contributor to "The Volokh Conspiracy". He blogged anonymously under the pseudonym "Juan Non-Volokh" at "The Volokh Conspiracy" until May 1, 2006.

Adler serves on the advisory board of the NFIB Legal Foundation, and the Environmental Law Reporter and ELI Press Advisory Board of the Environmental Law Institute.

In 2004, Adler received the Paul M. Bator Award. In 2007, the Case Western Reserve University Law Alumni Association awarded Adler their annual "Distinguished Teacher Award."

Adler clerked for Judge David B. Sentelle. From 1991–2000, he worked at the conservative Competitive Enterprise Institute, where he directed the Institute's environmental studies program, and worked on environmental policy matters. Although a proponent of "free-market environmentalism," Adler has also endorsed the imposition of a carbon tax and other measures to address the problem of climate change. He is also credited with helping to convince some former climate change deniers to accept the scientific evidence for global warming and the associated threat. Adler is currently one of the most cited law professors in the fields of administrative and environmental law.

Adler supported former Republican Tennessee Senator Fred Thompson in the 2008 presidential election. In 2012, Adler headed a screening committee appointed by Ohio governor John Kasich to assist him in selecting an appointee to fill an open seat on the Ohio Supreme Court. Adler again participated in the selection process to fill an open Ohio Supreme Court seat in 2017. Hs has also served on the Bipartisan Judicial Advisory Commission appointed by Ohio Senators Sherrod Brown and Rob Portman to advise on federal district court nominations.

In 2018, Adler was a founding member of Checks and Balances. As part of Checks and Balances, Adler has joined multiple statements criticizing former President Trump and defending rule of law values.

Role in health care litigation 
Adler's research and writing on the Affordable Care Act is credited with inspiring litigation that led to a Supreme Court challenge to the lawfulness of tax credits in states that failed to create their own health insurance exchanges. Adler first wrote an article for a 2011 health care symposium in which he argued that the text of the Affordable Care Act did not authorize tax credits in states that refused to set up their own health insurance exchanges. At the time this did not seem like a significant observation as the Supreme Court had not yet decided NFIB v. Sebelius and it appeared that most states would voluntarily create their own exchanges. As states started to resist implementing the Affordable Care Act, Adler co-authored several pieces with Michael Cannon of the Cato Institute arguing that an IRS rule authorizing tax credits in states that did not create their own exchanges would be unlawful. Adler and Cannon's arguments were controversial, and prompted significant academic response. Adler and Cannon's work also prompted several lawsuits challenging the lawfulness of the tax credits, including Halbig v. Sebelius and King v. Burwell. Adler and Cannon filed amicus briefs defending their research in several of the cases. In the end, however, the U.S. Supreme Court rejected Adler and Cannon's interpretation by a 6–3 vote in King v. Burwell. Adler's scholarship has also been relied upon in other Supreme Court cases, and was cited by Chief Justice Roberts in his City of Arlington v. FCC dissent and by Justice Gorsuch in Kisor v. Wilkie.

Family 
In 2001, Adler moved to Cleveland, Ohio, where he met his wife, Christina. He currently lives in Ohio, with his wife and two daughters.

Books 
 Marijuana Federalism: Uncle Sam and Mary Jane (2020), ISBN 9780815737896
Business and the Roberts Court, Editor (2016), 
 A Conspiracy Against Obamacare: The Volokh Conspiracy and the Health Care Case, co-author (2013), 
 Rebuilding the Ark: New Perspectives on Endangered Species Act Reform (2011), 
 Ecology, Liberty & Property: A Free Market Environmental Reader, Editor (2000) 
 The Costs of Kyoto:  Climate Change Policy and Its Implications, Editor (1997), 
 Environmentalism at the Crossroads: Green Activism in America (1995),

References

External links
 

Living people
20th-century American male writers
21st-century American lawyers
21st-century American male writers
American male bloggers
American bloggers
American legal scholars
American legal writers
Antonin Scalia Law School alumni
Case Western Reserve University faculty
Cato Institute people
Federalist Society members
Ohio lawyers
Ohio Republicans
People from Hudson, Ohio
Writers from Philadelphia
Yale College alumni
20th-century American non-fiction writers
21st-century American non-fiction writers
Friends' Central School alumni
Year of birth missing (living people)